Aubrey Provost Reeder was an Australian Archdeacon in the 20th century.

Reeder was ordained in 1944. He served curacies in Bathurst, Trundle and Coolah. He was Diocesan Youth Officer for Bathurst from 1957 to 1963. He held incumbencies at Cudal, Coonamble and Mudgee. He was Archdeacon of Barker from 1983 to 1986.

Reeder died on 2 June 1987.

Notes

20th-century Australian Anglican priests
Archdeacons of Barker
1987 deaths